A Stranger in the Kingdom is a 1997 American drama film directed by Jay Craven and starring Ernie Hudson, David Lansbury, Martin Sheen and Jean Louisa Kelly.  It is based on the novel of the same name by Howard Frank Mosher.

Cast
Ernie Hudson as Reverend Walter Andrews
Sean Nelson as Nathan
Bill Raymond as Resolved Kennison
David Lansbury as Charlie
Henry Gibson as Zachariah Barrows
George Dickerson as Sheriff Mason White
Jordan Bayne as Claire LaRiviere
Jean Louisa Kelly as Athena
Michael Ryan Segal as Frenchy LeMost
Rusty DeWees as Harlan Kittredge
Martin Sheen as Sigurd Moulton
Larry Pine as Edward Kinneson
Tom Aldredge as Elijah Kinneson
Carrie Snodgress as Ruth Kinneson

Release
The film made its premiere at the Grand in Ellsworth, Maine on December 4, 1997.  The film was also screened at the Hollywood Film Festival on August 9, 1998.

References

External links
 
 

American drama films
1997 drama films
1997 films
Films based on American novels
Cockfighting in film
1990s English-language films
1990s American films